Siphonaria zelandica is a species of medium-sized air-breathing sea snail or false limpet, a marine pulmonate gastropod mollusc in the family Siphonariidae, the false limpets.

Description
The length of the shell attains 19.9 mm.

Distribution
This marine species occurs off New Zealand and Lord Howe Island.

References

 Quoy, J. R. C.; Gaimard, P. (1833). Voyage de découvertes de l'Astrolabe exécuté par ordre du Roi, pendant les années 1826-1827-1828-1829, sous le commandement de M. J. Dumont d'Urville. Zoologie. Tome IV, 366pp. Paris.
 Powell A. W. B., New Zealand Mollusca, William Collins Publishers Ltd, Auckland, New Zealand 1979 
 Jenkins, B. W. 1983. Redescriptions and relationship of Siphonaria zelandica Quoy and Gaimard to S. australis Quoy and Gaimard with a description of S. propria sp. nov. (Mollusca: Pulmonata: Siphonariidae).

External links
  Reeve, L. A. (1856). Monograph of the genus Siphonaria. In: Conchologia Iconica, or, illustrations of the shells of molluscous animals, vol. 9, pl. 1-7 and unpaginated text. L. Reeve & Co., London.
 Iredale, T. (1940). Marine Molluscs from Lord Howe Island, Norfolk Island, Australia, and New Caledonia. Australian Zoologist. 9: 429-443.
 Dayrat, B.; Goulding, T. C.; White, T. R. (2014). Diversity of Indo-West Pacific Siphonaria (Mollusca: Gastropoda: Euthyneura). Zootaxa. 3779(2): 246-276

Siphonariidae
Gastropods described in 1833